Mykola Volodymyrovych Shaparenko (born 4 October 1998) is a Ukrainian professional footballer who plays as a midfielder for Ukrainian Premier League club FC Dynamo Kyiv and the Ukraine national team.

Shaparenko is one of the youngest players to have scored in the Ukrainian Premier League.

Club career

Illichivets Mariupol
Shaparenko is a product of the FC Illichivets Mariupol sportive school.

He made his début for Illichivets Mariupol as a substitute player in a 6–2 loss against Shaktar Donetsk in the Ukrainian Premier League on 5 April 2015.

Dynamo Kyiv
In June 2015, Shaparenko signed a contract with FC Dynamo Kyiv. After playing for Dynamo's youth and reserve teams for two seasons, he made his senior team debut on 18 November 2017 at Zirka Stadium, as a stoppage-time substitute in a 2–0 victory over FC Zirka Kropyvnytskyi.

International career
Shaparenko made his debut for Ukraine on 31 May 2018 at Stade de Genève, coming on as a substitute in a friendly against Morocco.

Career statistics

Club

International

''As of match played 14 June 2022. Ukraine score listed first, score column indicates score after each Shaparenko goal.

Honours
Dynamo Kyiv
Ukrainian Premier League: 2020–21
Ukrainian Cup: 2019–20, 2020–21
Ukrainian Super Cup: 2018, 2019, 2020

References

External links

 
 

1998 births
Living people
Sportspeople from Donetsk Oblast
Ukrainian footballers
Association football midfielders
Ukraine international footballers
Ukraine under-21 international footballers
Ukraine youth international footballers
UEFA Euro 2020 players
Ukrainian Premier League players
FC Mariupol players
FC Dynamo Kyiv players